Jenny Yue-fon Yang is an American chemist. She is an associate professor of chemistry at the University of California, Irvine where she leads a research group focused on inorganic chemistry, catalysis, and solar fuels.

Early life and education 
Jenny Yue-fon Yang was born in the San Fernando Valley and raised in Chatsworth, Los Angeles. She is a second-generation Taiwanese-American. Yang studied Chemistry at the University of California, Berkeley, where she worked in the laboratory of Jeffrey R. Long. Yang synthesized novel Prussian blue analog materials and analyzed their magnetic properties. She graduated in 2001 with a Bachelors in Science in Chemistry, and moved to the Massachusetts Institute of Technology for graduate studies in the laboratory of Daniel G. Nocera. Yang's work in the Nocera lab focused on the synthesis of novel salen complexes that mimic the activity of the catalase enzyme, and exhibit epoxidation activity towards olefins. She graduated with her Ph.D. in 2007.

Career 
Yang moved to Washington to conduct postdoctoral research at the Pacific Northwest National Laboratory (PNNL), where she worked with Daniel L. DuBois on mechanistic studies of H2 oxidation with nickel bis(diphosphine) complexes. In 2009, she was hired as a senior staff scientist at PNNL. She then worked as a research scientist at the Molecular Catalysis group of the Joint Center for Artificial Photosynthesis at the California Institute of Technology. In 2013, Yang joined the faculty at University of California, Irvine as an assistant professor of chemistry.

Yang's publishes in the area inorganic and organometallic chemistry, electrocatalysis, as well as materials science.

Awards and honors 
Yang has received several awards. These include the DoE Early Career Research Award in 2014 and the National Science Foundation CAREER Award in 2016. In 2017, she was honored with the Presidential Early Career Award for Scientists and Engineers (PECASE), the Kavli Frontiers of Science Fellowship, and a Research Corporation Advanced Energy Materials Scialog Fellowship. In 2018, she was awarded a Sloan Research Fellowship, and in 2019 she was named a Camille Dreyfus Teacher-Scholar. In 2015, Yang was selected as a member of the Global Young Academy and in 2018, she was named a CIFAR Azrieli Global Scholars.

References

External links
 
 

American women chemists
21st-century American chemists
21st-century American women scientists
UC Berkeley College of Chemistry alumni
Massachusetts Institute of Technology School of Science alumni
University of California, Irvine faculty
California Institute of Technology faculty
Sloan Research Fellows
People from Chatsworth, Los Angeles
Scientists from California
Living people
Year of birth missing (living people)
American people of Taiwanese descent
American people of Chinese descent
American women academics